Baregahi (also Romanized as Bāregāhī and Bārgāhī; also known as Gāhī) is a village in Dalaki Rural District, in the Central District of Dashtestan County, Bushehr Province, Iran. At the 2006 census, its population was 267, in 49 families.

References 

Populated places in Dashtestan County